Wojciech Nowicki (born 22 February 1989) is a Polish hammer thrower. He won the gold medal at the 2020 Summer Olympics and bronze medals at the 2016 Summer Olympics, 2015, 2017 and 2019 World Championships. His personal best in the event is 82.52 metres set in 2021 at the Olympic Games in Tokyo.

Career
Nowicki achieved his personal best, 78.71 metres, on 3 May 2015. In August of the same year, he won the bronze medal in the hammer throw event at the 2015 World Championships in Athletics in Beijing, China. He placed third again at the two subsequent World Championships (London 2017 and Doha 2019).

In July 2016, Nowicki took bronze at the European Athletics Championships in Amsterdam, Netherlands. In August, he was awarded the bronze medal in the hammer throw at the 2016 Summer Olympics in Rio de Janeiro, Brazil. At the 2020 Summer Olympics, Nowicki won the qualification with a throw of 79.78 m. In the third attempt of the finals, he managed to improve his personal best from 81.72 m to 82.52 m which secured him the gold medal, while Eivind Henriksen took silver and his fellow countryman Paweł Fajdek placed third.

Competition record

Personal life
Nowicki and his wife Anna have two daughters – Amelia and Izabela. He studied mechanical engineering at the Bialystok University of Technology.

References

External links

1989 births
Living people
Polish male hammer throwers
World Athletics Championships athletes for Poland
World Athletics Championships medalists
Athletes (track and field) at the 2016 Summer Olympics
Athletes (track and field) at the 2020 Summer Olympics
Medalists at the 2016 Summer Olympics
Medalists at the 2020 Summer Olympics
Olympic athletes of Poland
Sportspeople from Białystok
Olympic bronze medalists for Poland
Olympic gold medalists for Poland
Olympic bronze medalists in athletics (track and field)
Olympic gold medalists in athletics (track and field)
Olympic male hammer throwers
Podlasie Białystok athletes
European Athletics Championships winners
Polish Athletics Championships winners
Competitors at the 2013 Summer Universiade
Bialystok University of Technology alumni
20th-century Polish people
21st-century Polish people